Bağbaşı is a village in the Kâhta District, Adıyaman Province, Turkey. The village is populated by Kurds of the Mirdêsî tribe and had a population of 1,191 in 2021.

The hamlet of İkizler is attached to Bağbaşı.

References

Villages in Kâhta District
Kurdish settlements in Adıyaman Province